Katarina Johanna Agatha Legemate is a Dutch former football midfielder. Throughout her career she played for Ter Leede in the pre-2007 Hoofdklasse and ADO Den Haag and AZ in the Eredivisie. She retired in 2011 following AZ's disbandment.

She was a member of the Dutch national team and played 22 matches between her debut on 5 February 2006 against Finland and her last match on 8 August 2009 against Poland.

Titles
 4 Dutch Leagues (2003, 2004, 2007, 2010)
 2 Dutch Cups (2007, 2011)
 2 Dutch Supercups (2004, 2007)

References

1983 births
Living people
Dutch women's footballers
Netherlands women's international footballers
Eredivisie (women) players
Telstar (women's football club) players
AZ Alkmaar (women) players
ADO Den Haag (women) players
People from Kaag en Braassem
Women's association football midfielders
Ter Leede players
Footballers from South Holland
21st-century Dutch women